Leyland is a town in the South Ribble district of Lancashire, England.  It contains 46 buildings that are recorded in the National Heritage List for England as designated listed buildings.  Of these, three are listed at Grade II*, the middle grade, and the others are at Grade II, the lowest grade.  The listed buildings include churches and associated structures, houses, farmhouses and farm buildings, schools, a public house, and almshouses.


Key

Buildings

Former listed buildings

References

Citations

Sources

Lists of listed buildings in Lancashire
Buildings and structures in South Ribble
Listed